The Brügger & Thomet GL06 is a dedicated stand-alone shoulder-fired 40× grenade launcher intended for military and police applications.

History
The GL06 was developed in 2006 in response to a recent request from the police force of a leading European country which sought to obtain a less-lethal weapon for anti-riot application with the particular need for pin-point accuracy at standoff ranges (beyond  for such scenarios) when firing impact rounds. The Thun-based Brügger & Thomet (B&T) company provided its client with both a weapon and a special round, with the added benefit of compatibility with a wide array of lethal and less-lethal ammunition produced in the  low-velocity class.

Design
The GL06 is a stand-alone shoulder-firing weapon intended for military and police applications. A special "less-lethal" version of GL06 was produced as the LL06. Although the LL06 was marketed as a variation of the GL06, the only difference is the bright yellow color of the frame, compared to the standard black of the GL06. Both weapons are fully capable of firing a complete range of lethal and less-lethal 40× ammunition.

The GL06 is lighter and more compact than other stand-alone weapons of the same class (such as the US M79 or German HK69A1), yet it is capable of greater accuracy, tactical flexibility and has good ergonomics.

Production
The GL06 is also produced by four different manufacturers around the world.

Users

 : several police departments : Sûreté du Québec (SR), Service de police de la Ville de Montréal, Toronto Police Service
  : Estonian Defence Forces
  – Used by the Police Nationale (since 2008), the Gendarmerie Nationale and others
 : Hungary Police
 : Garda Síochána : Garda Emergency Response Unit (ERU) and Armed Support Units (ASU) 
  : Kazakh Police 
 : Kuwait Police
 : Lithuanian Police 
  : Policja
 : Slovenian National Police Force
  – Mossos d'Esquadra
 : Swedish Police Authority
  – several police departments
  – produced as Fort-600
  : U.S. Customs and Border Protection, LL-06
  : Viking Squad, LL-06

Others 
Between one and seven B&T Gl-06 and LL-06 have been exported in other countries : Italy, Bosnia and Herzegovina, Island, Serbia, United Kingdom, Belgium, Netherlands, Austria, Germany, Portugal, Oman, South Africa, Malaysia, Kenya and United Arab Emirates.

References

External links
 
 B&T GL06 Grenade Launcher
 B&T GL06 Technical Specifications

40×46mm grenade launchers
Teargas grenade guns
Riot guns
Firearms of Switzerland